Ignatki-Kolonia  is a village in the administrative district of Gmina Juchnowiec Kościelny, within Białystok County, Podlaskie Voivodeship, in north-eastern Poland.

The village has a population of 210.

References

Ignatki-Kolonia